Claude Chazottes (born 7 January 1949) is a French former professional footballer who played as a defender and midfielder. He competed in the men's tournament at the 1976 Summer Olympics.

Personal life
After the conclusion of his professional career in 1985, Chazottes kept on playing football at an amateur level. He played for JS Saint-Astier from 1985 to 1987, CO Coulounieix-Chamiers from 1987 to 1988, JS Saint-Astier again from 1988 to 1996, ES La Chapelle-Gonaguet from 1996 to 2008, and JS Saint-Astier for a third time after 2008.

Notes

References

External links
 

1949 births
Living people
French footballers
Olympic footballers of France
Footballers at the 1976 Summer Olympics
Sportspeople from Épinay-sur-Seine
Association football defenders
Association football midfielders
CS Sedan Ardennes players
Paris FC players
Red Star F.C. players
Périgueux Foot players
Ligue 1 players
Ligue 2 players
French Division 4 (1978–1993) players
French Division 3 (1971–1993) players
Footballers from Seine-Saint-Denis